Callaway High School is a public high school located in Hogansville, Georgia, United States.  It enrolls students in grades 9-12 from LaGrange, Hogansville, and the surrounding area. The principal is Jonathan Laney. The mascot of Callaway is the Cavalier.

History and demographics 
Callaway High School opened in 1996 to replace Hogansville High School. It was named after the Callaway family who lived in the area.

Callaway is the smallest of the three public high schools in Troup County.  In 2010, Callaway had 824 students. In 2010, the student body was 60% white, 37% black, 1% Asian, 1% Hispanic and 1% multi-racial. About 55% of Callaway's students were considered economically disadvantaged, and 9% were disabled.

Academics
The school offers Advanced Placement courses in:
Art: Studio 2-D Design
Biology
Calculus BC
Chemistry
English Language and Composition
English Literature and Composition
Government
Psychology
United States Government and Politics

Sports
Callaway sports teams include football, competition cheer, softball, volleyball, basketball, wrestling, baseball, golf, soccer, and tennis.

Callaway is in Region 5AA in Georgia.  In 2020, the school's football team won their first State Championship, defeating Fitzgerald High School. The head football coach is Coach Pete Wiggins.

References

Public high schools in Georgia (U.S. state)
Schools in Troup County, Georgia